The 2013 WNBA season is the 17th season for the San Antonio Silver Stars franchise of the Women's National Basketball Association. It is their 11th in San Antonio.

Transactions

WNBA Draft
The following are the Silver Stars' selections in the 2013 WNBA Draft.

Trades

Personnel changes

Additions

Subtractions

Roster

Depth

Season standings

Schedule

Preseason

|- style="background:#fcc;"
		 | 1 
		 | May 11
		 |  Indiana
		 | 
		 | Jia Perkins (14)
		 | Julie Wojta (7)
		 | Danielle Robinson (5)
		 | AT&T Center4325
		 | 0–1
|- style="background:#cfc;"
		 | 2 
		 | May 15
		 | @ Indiana
		 | 
		 | Danielle Adams (11)
		 | Jayne Appel (10)
		 | Danielle Robinson (4)
		 | Bankers Life Fieldhouse5339
		 | 1–1

Regular season

|- style="background:#fcc;"
		 | 1 
		 | May 24
		 |  Indiana
		 | 
		 | Shenise Johnson (14)
		 | Appel, Johnson, & Alexander (5)
		 | Danielle Robinson (9)
		 | AT&T Center8054
		 | 0–1

|- style="background:#cfc;"
		 | 2 
		 | June 1
		 |  Los Angeles
		 | 
		 | Shenise Johnson (19)
		 | Jayne Appel (9)
		 | Danielle Robinson (7)
		 | AT&T Center6081
		 | 1–1
|- style="background:#cfc;"
		 | 3 
		 | June 7
		 |  Chicago
		 | 
		 | Danielle Robinson (18)
		 | Jayne Appel (10)
		 | Danielle Robinson (7)
		 | AT&T Center6244
		 | 2–1
|- style="background:#fcc;"
		 | 4 
		 | June 9
		 | @ Chicago
		 | 
		 | Jia Perkins (20)
		 | Jayne Appel (8)
		 | Danielle Robinson (7)
		 | Allstate Arena4293
		 | 2–2
|- style="background:#fcc;"
		 | 5 
		 | June 11
		 | @ Minnesota
		 | 
		 | Shenise Johnson (16)
		 | DeLisha Milton-Jones (8)
		 | Danielle Robinson (7)
		 | Target Center7913
		 | 2–3
|- style="background:#fcc;"
		 | 6 
		 | June 15
		 | @ Los Angeles
		 | 
		 | Danielle Adams (12)
		 | Shenise Johnson (6)
		 | Davellyn Whyte (5)
		 | Staples Center6980
		 | 2–4
|- style="background:#fcc;"
		 | 7 
		 | June 21
		 |  Seattle
		 | 
		 | Jia Perkins (21)
		 | Shenise Johnson (7)
		 | Danielle Robinson (6)
		 | AT&T Center7009
		 | 2–5
|- style="background:#cfc;"
		 | 8 
		 | June 23
		 | @ NY Liberty
		 | 
		 | Danielle Robinson (18)
		 | Danielle Adams (11)
		 | Danielle Robinson (4)
		 | Prudential Center6123
		 | 3–5
|- style="background:#fcc;"
		 | 9 
		 | June 25
		 |  Phoenix
		 | 
		 | Christon, Adams, & Robinson (15)
		 | Milton-Jones & Robinson (6)
		 | Danielle Robinson (10)
		 | AT&T Center9007
		 | 3–6
|- style="background:#fcc;"
		 | 10 
		 | June 30
		 | @ Atlanta
		 | 
		 | Jia Perkins (19)
		 | Alexander & Whyte (5)
		 | Danielle Robinson (9)
		 | Philips Arena5359
		 | 3–7

|- style="background:#fcc;"
		 | 11 
		 | July 6
		 | @ Los Angeles
		 | 
		 | DeLisha Milton-Jones (20)
		 | Jayne Appel (9)
		 | Danielle Robinson (5)
		 | Staples Center9807
		 | 3–8
|- style="background:#cfc;"
		 | 12 
		 | July 10
		 | @ Phoenix
		 | 
		 | Danielle Adams (19)
		 | Jayne Appel (8)
		 | Danielle Robinson (9)
		 | US Airways Center8707
		 | 4–8
|- style="background:#fcc;"
		 | 13 
		 | July 12
		 |  Washington
		 | 
		 | Jia Perkins (22)
		 | DeLisha Milton-Jones (7)
		 | Danielle Robinson (9)
		 | AT&T Center11268
		 | 4–9
|- style="background:#fcc;"
		 | 14 
		 | July 14
		 | @ Connecticut
		 | 
		 | Jia Perkins (23)
		 | Jayne Appel (8)
		 | Danielle Robinson (8)
		 | Mohegan Sun Arena6335
		 | 4–10
|- style="background:#fcc;"
		 | 15 
		 | July 16
		 | @ Washington
		 | 
		 | Johnson & Perkins (12)
		 | Milton-Jones & Alexander (6)
		 | Danielle Robinson (8)
		 | Verizon Center6843
		 | 4–11
|- style="background:#fcc;"
		 | 16 
		 | July 19
		 |  Minnesota
		 | 
		 | Adams, Perkins, & Johnson (13)
		 | Jayne Appel (9)
		 | Danielle Robinson (3)
		 | AT&T Center7105
		 | 4–12
|- style="background:#cfc;"
		 | 17 
		 | July 20
		 |  Connecticut
		 | 
		 | Danielle Adams (20)
		 | Jayne Appel (18)
		 | Jia Perkins (4)
		 | AT&T Center8375
		 | 5–12
|- style="background:#cfc;"
		 | 18 
		 | July 25
		 |  NY Liberty
		 | 
		 | Danielle Adams (20)
		 | Jayne Appel (13)
		 | Danielle Robinson (6)
		 | AT&T Center12086
		 | 6–12

|- align="center"
|colspan="9" bgcolor="#bbcaff"|All-Star Break
|- style="background:#fcc;"
		 | 19 
		 | August 2
		 | @ Minnesota
		 | 
		 | Shameka Christon (15)
		 | Jayne Appel (9)
		 | Danielle Robinson (7)
		 | Target Center8733
		 | 6–13
|- style="background:#cfc;"
		 | 20 
		 | August 4
		 |  Tulsa
		 | 
		 | Danielle Robinson (19)
		 | Jayne Appel (13)
		 | Danielle Robinson (9)
		 | AT&T Center7950
		 | 7–13
|- style="background:#fcc;"
		 | 21 
		 | August 6
		 |  Minnesota
		 | 
		 | Danielle Adams (31)
		 | Danielle Robinson (9)
		 | Danielle Robinson (10)
		 | AT&T Center5390
		 | 7–14
|- style="background:#cfc;"
		 | 22 
		 | August 9
		 | @ Seattle
		 | 
		 | Shenise Johnson (15)
		 | Jayne Appel (7)
		 | Danielle Robinson (8)
		 | Key Arena5978
		 | 8–14
|- style="background:#fcc;"
		 | 23 
		 | August 11
		 | @ Seattle
		 | 
		 | Jia Perkins (19)
		 | Jayne Appel (16)
		 | Danielle Robinson (6)
		 | Key Arena6249
		 | 8–15
|- style="background:#cfc;"
		 | 24 
		 | August 17
		 |  Phoenix
		 | 
		 | Adams & Robinson (20)
		 | Jayne Appel (8)
		 | Danielle Robinson (8)
		 | AT&T Center10906
		 | 9–15
|- style="background:#fcc;"
		 | 25 
		 | August 21
		 | @ Indiana
		 | 
		 | Danielle Adams (17)
		 | Danielle Adams (9)
		 | Jayne Appel (4)
		 | Bankers Life Fieldhouse7416
		 | 9–16
|- style="background:#fcc;"
		 | 26 
		 | August 23
		 | @ Tulsa
		 | 
		 | Shameka Christon (18)
		 | Johnson & Alexander (8)
		 | Perkins & Christon (3)
		 | BOK Center5923
		 | 9–17
|- style="background:#cfc;"
		 | 27 
		 | August 25
		 |  Seattle
		 | 
		 | Shenise Johnson (17)
		 | Shenise Johnson (10)
		 | Davellyn Whyte (7)
		 | AT&T Center6828
		 | 10–17
|- style="background:#fcc;"
		 | 28 
		 | August 27
		 |  Seattle
		 | 
		 | Jia Perkins (17)
		 | Johnson & Appel (6)
		 | Davellyn Whyte (4)
		 | AT&T Center6097
		 | 10–18
|- style="background:#cfc;"
		 | 29 
		 | August 30
		 | @ Tulsa
		 | 
		 | Jia Perkins (19)
		 | Jayne Appel (11)
		 | Johnson & Perkins (4)
		 | BOK Center5452
		 | 11–18
|- style="background:#fcc;"
		 | 30 
		 | August 31
		 |  Los Angeles
		 | 
		 | Jia Perkins (25)
		 | Jayne Appel (12)
		 | Jia Perkins (3)
		 | AT&T Center8086
		 | 11–19

|- style="background:#fcc;"
		 | 31 
		 | September 6
		 | @ Phoenix
		 | 
		 | Danielle Adams (26)
		 | Jayne Appel (17)
		 | Shenise Johnson (4)
		 | US Airways Center9006
		 | 11–20
|- style="background:#fcc;"
		 | 32 
		 | September 8
		 |  Tulsa
		 | 
		 | Jia Perkins (21)
		 | Jayne Appel (7)
		 | Appel & Johnson (4)
		 | AT&T Center6560
		 | 11–21
|- style="background:#fcc;"
		 | 33 
		 | September 13
		 | @ Phoenix
		 | 
		 | Adams & Johnson (11)
		 | Jayne Appel (10)
		 | Shenise Johnson (4)
		 | US Airways Center8899
		 | 11–22
|- style="background:#cfc;"
		 | 34 
		 | September 15
		 |  Atlanta
		 | 
		 | Danielle Adams (39)
		 | Danielle Adams (8)
		 | Shenise Johnson (6)
		 | AT&T Center7486
		 | 12–22

Statistics

Regular season

Awards and honors

References

External links

San Antonio Stars seasons
San Antonio